Lenore Taylor is an Australian journalist. She has been the editor of The Guardian Australia since May 2016.

Raised in Brisbane, Taylor attended Brisbane Girls Grammar School and studied journalism and politics at the University of Queensland, where she was co-editor of the student newspaper Semper Floreat. She began working as a journalist in 1987 at The Canberra Times. She was later national affairs correspondent and then chief political correspondent at the Sydney Morning Herald, before becoming The Guardian Australia's first political editor from 2013 to 2016.

She has won the "Scoop of the Year" Walkley Award twice: in 2010, for her reporting on the Rudd government's shelving of an emissions trading scheme, and in 2014, for a joint report on Australian spying on the Indonesian government. She also won the 2014 Paul Lyneham Award for excellence in journalism and the Federal Parliamentary Press Gallery Journalist of the Year in 2007 and 2014.

Taylor published her first book, Shitstorm: Inside Labor's Darkest Days (about Kevin Rudd's first term as Prime Minister) in 2010.

She is married to author and journalist Paul Daley.

References 

Living people
Australian newspaper editors
Women newspaper editors
Australian political journalists
Australian women journalists
Walkley Award winners
Date of birth missing (living people)
Place of birth missing (living people)
Year of birth missing (living people)
The Sydney Morning Herald people